The RMIT Health Innovations Research Institute (HIRi) was a major research institute of RMIT University.

Health Innovations Research Institute, RMIT